Ann Elizabeth "Betsy" Sheridan Le Fanu (1758–1837) was an Anglo-Irish diarist and novelist. She was a daughter of Irish stage actor Thomas Sheridan and the sister of satirist Richard Brinsley Sheridan and playwright Alicia Sheridan Le Fanu. She married Captain Henry Le Fanu in 1791, and their daughter Alicia Le Fanu was also a writer.

Works
 pseudonym:"the  Authoress Of Emeline"
 – journal entries compiled and edited by relative William LeFanu

References

External sites
 Corvey Women Writers on the Web author page

Irish diarists
Le Fanu family
1758 births
1837 deaths
18th-century Irish women writers
19th-century Irish women writers
Date of birth unknown
Place of birth unknown
Date of death unknown